Dancing Queen is an American documentary  reality television series featuring Alyssa Edwards, that debuted on Netflix on October 5, 2018.

Cast 
 Alyssa Edwards, owner and artistic director at Beyond Belief Dance Company
 Shangela Laquifa Wadley, Alyssa's friend and drag daughter
 Laganja Estranja, Alyssa's friend, drag daughter
 Marcella Raneri, assistant director at Beyond Belief
 Dawn Robbins, manager of Beyond Belief
 Celeste Robbins, choreographer and assistant director as well as dancer for 8 years at Beyond Belief
 Nick, a dance teacher at Beyond Belief.
 Shelly, a former dance mom at Beyond Belief
 Robbie and Neil, costume designers for Alyssa and some of the students at Beyond Belief
 Kristen, Willow's mother
 Kelly, Ainsley's mother

Students 
 Ainsley, a 7-year-old girl who makes the mini travelling elite team
 Athena, a 7-year-old girl who auditions for the mini travelling elite team but doesn't make the cut
 Leigha, a 10-year-old girl with spina bifida who auditions for the mini travelling elite team.
 Josie, a 15-year-old girl who has been dancing with the company for 9 years.
 Kiana, a 16-year-old girl who has been dancing with the company for 9 years. She makes the senior travelling elite team
 Willow, a 17-year-old girl who makes the senior travelling elite team
 Makenna, a 16-year-old girl who makes the elite travelling team
 Molly, 17-year-old girl who makes the elite travelling team
 Kennedy, 16-year-old girl who makes the elite travelling team
 Riley, 16-year-old girl who makes the elite travelling team
 Brooke, 16-year-old girl who makes the elite travelling team
 Gabe Flowers, 18-year-old boy who makes the elite travelling team

Episodes

See also
 List of original programs distributed by Netflix

References

2010s American LGBT-related television series
2010s American reality television series
2010s LGBT-related reality television series
2018 American television series debuts
English-language Netflix original programming
Netflix original documentary television series
American LGBT-related reality television series
American LGBT-related web series